Stephen James McKeown (born 17 July 1981) is a Scottish retired footballer who played as an attacking midfielder.

Career
McKeown was raised in the Fernhill district of Rutherglen and attended Trinity High School in the town.

He joined Airdrieonians at the age of 16 from a local boys' club on the recommendation of Sandy Stewart, spending four years with that version of the club and six more with its successor Airdrie United from its inception in 2002. At one point he lost his enjoyment for football and was ready to quit the game, but recanted after advice from Stewart and his father. In 2006 he scored a late penalty as Airdrie eliminated top-division Dunfermline from the Scottish Cup.

McKeown signed for Partick Thistle of the First Division at the opening of the January transfer window of 2008. Soon after joining, he scored against Rangers in a League Cup tie. He joined Ayr United after leaving Partick in summer 2010 on a free transfer.

McKeown was released from his contract at Ayr following a training ground incident and rejoined Airdrie United in January 2011. He lasted two months at the Diamonds before leaving the club, citing commitments away from football as the reason.

He later joined Junior club Pollok FC in January 2012 and made his first start for the club in the Emirates Scottish Junior Cup Fourth Round. On 28 September 2013, McKeown joined Irvine Meadow, also of the Junior grade.

Personal life
His nieces Kodie Hay and Brogan Hay are also footballers who play for Glasgow City.

References

External links

1981 births
Living people
Scottish footballers
Airdrieonians F.C. (1878) players
Airdrieonians F.C. players
Partick Thistle F.C. players
Ayr United F.C. players
Pollok F.C. players
Irvine Meadow XI F.C. players
Scottish Football League players
Scottish Junior Football Association players
Sportspeople from Rutherglen
People educated at Trinity High School, Rutherglen
Association football midfielders
Footballers from South Lanarkshire